Gayle M. Wright (born 1951) is a former Democratic member of the Pennsylvania House of Representatives.

Biography
Originally from Port Huron, Michigan, Wright earned a degree in education from the University of Akron and pursued graduate studies in correctional counseling at Gannon University. 

Prior to elective office, she taught high school and middle school in Erie, Pennsylvania. She also served three terms on the Erie City Council, and was elected as city council president in 1997.

Wright was subsequently elected to represent the 2nd legislative district in the Pennsylvania House of Representatives in a special election on August 14, 2001, following the May 2001 death of Italo Cappabianca. She won a controversial endorsement by the local Democratic Committee over Cappabianca's widow, Linda. Cappabianca decided against mounting a formal write-in campaign, citing time constraints, but encouraged voters to write her in as an independent candidate. Wright won the August 14 contest with 48.2% of the vote, with Cappabianca placing a strong second with 39.1%. 

In 2002, Wright was named to the PoliticsPA list of Best Dressed Legislators.

She lost the 2002 Democratic primary election to Florindo Fabrizio.

References

External links
Pennsylvania House of Representatives - Gayle M. Wright (Democrat) official PA House profile (archived)
Pennsylvania House Democratic Caucus - Gayle Wright official Party website (archived)

Living people
1951 births
University of Akron alumni
Gannon University alumni
Democratic Party members of the Pennsylvania House of Representatives
Women state legislators in Pennsylvania
Schoolteachers from Pennsylvania
American women educators
People from Port Huron, Michigan
21st-century American women